GloZell Lyneette Green (born July 30, 1972), better known as GloZell, is an American YouTube personality. GloZell established her YouTube channel in 2008, with video interviews, comedy about her life and song parodies.  By 2015, the channel had accumulated more than four million subscribers and more than 700 million total views. Her most popular videos include her cinnamon challenge video, which has accumulated more than 53 million views, and "My Push up Bra will help me get my man" video, with more than 25 million views.  She gained wide notice when her blog about meeting Elijah Wood was mentioned by the actor during a 2011 interview on Jimmy Kimmel Live!.  In 2012, she appeared in the web series Dr. Fubalous.

In 2015, GloZell interviewed President Barack Obama in a YouTube livestream hosted at the White House. In 2018, Green had a small role as Little Debbie in Ralph Breaks the Internet.

In December 2020, it was announced that Green would be hosting "The GloZell Show" with Million Stories Media.

Early life
GloZell was born to Gloria and Ozell Green, her name being a portmanteau of the names of her parents. She has one sister, DeOnzell, who is an opera singer. In 1997, GloZell graduated from the University of Florida with a BFA degree in musical theatre.

Career
In 2003, GloZell moved to Hollywood, California, to pursue a career in acting and comedy. She joined The Groundlings and studied her favorite comedian, Jay Leno, by attending 600 consecutive tapings of The Tonight Show with Jay Leno. She began a blog that included a series of interviews with other audience members at Leno's show, but she soon began using YouTube as a video host for the interviews. She began to create and post original comedy videos when people she met at Leno tapings told her that she was funny on her own. Her first viral YouTube video, in 2008, was "My Push up Bra will help me get my man"; by 2013, it had gained over 20 million views. She began to make more frequent YouTube comedy videos focusing on her daily life, celebrity impersonations, song parodies, and Internet fads. Some of her most popular early videos were her "translations" of pop songs, such as Kesha's "Tik Tok" and Rihanna's "Rude Boy".

In 2011, GloZell gained wider notice when her vlog about meeting Elijah Wood was mentioned by the actor during an interview on Jimmy Kimmel Live!. Her 2012 cinnamon challenge video became quickly popular and was ranked fourth on The Guardian'''s "Viral Video Chart" in February 2012. As of 2016, it had amassed more than 48 million views. In June 2012, she was featured in the video Beauty and the Beat by Todrick Hall, which reimagines the opening of Disney's Beauty and the Beast, in which Belle lives in an urban African-American neighborhood. Also 2012, GloZell was featured alongside Danny Trejo and Flavor Flav and fellow YouTube personalities Antoine Dodson and Colleen Ballinger in the musical web series Dr. Fubalous, where GloZell played the titular doctor's "ranch dressing-loving secretary", Maude "Ma" Cakes.Maude Cakes , Dr. Fubalous, YouTube, accessed August 12, 2012

GloZell has performed her stand-up act at such comedy venues as The Comedy Store, The Improv, the Laugh Factory, Showtime at the Apollo, Steve Harvey Talent Show, and the J. Anthony Brown's J Spot Comedy Club. She has appeared on The Dr. Oz Show, 20/20, ABC News and MTV and has been featured in The Washington Post, the Los Angeles Times, U.S. News & World Report, Ebony, Cosmopolitan, People and Forbes magazines, among other media. Each year since 2013, GloZell has hosted a free live variety show called GloZell Fest, with celebrity and YouTube guests including Sisaundra Lewis, Meghan Tonjes, Frankie Grande, Miranda Sings and Far Young."3rd Annual GloZell Festival", Glitter Magazine, September 14, 2015 She has also published a book of inspirational poems called Wait! Let Me Tell You.

In May 2013, GloZell released her first single, titled "Pick Up After Your Dog", on the iTunes Store, and the music video was soon released on YouTube. She released her second single, "Glozell's Cinnamon Challenge", later in May. By 2013, GloZell's YouTube channel had received more than 400 million total views, with 2.7 million subscribers, and was ranked the 25th most viewed comedy channel on YouTube. By 2015, the channel had accumulated more than 4 million subscribers and more than 700 million views.

On January 22, 2015 GloZell interviewed Barack Obama in a YouTube livestream hosted at The White House. She talked to him about, among other issues, racial profiling and officer-involved shootings, relations with Cuba and cybersecurity. At the end of the interview she handed Obama green lipstick to give to the first lady and their children, but misspoke saying, "One for your first wife…" resulting in some laughs from the audience in the room. GloZell made a guest appearance in the Nickelodeon sitcom Game Shakers and played a role in the 2015 film The Wedding Ringer. She plays the voice role of Grandma Rosiepuff in DreamWorks' animated film Trolls. She also has a docuseries, Glo All In, about her and her husband's quest to have a child, ultimately with a surrogate mother.; and 

In June 2016, GloZell released an autobiography, Is You Okay?, written in collaboration with Nils Parker. In 2016, GloZell had a lead role as the Jazz Singer in the YouTube Red (now YouTube Premium) original series Escape the Night. The cast of the show, including her, Shane Dawson, Joey Graceffa, Lele Pons and Sierra Furtado, won the Streamy Award for best ensemble cast. In 2017, Green launched a new channel for preschoolers called GloBugz!, the series was produced by Bunim/Murray Productions.

In 2018, Green had a small role as Little Debbie in Ralph Breaks the Internet.

Personal life
GloZell was married from 2013 to 2019. She described her relationship with her ex-husband and their divorce in her autobiography Is You Okay?''. GloZell lived in Los Angeles with her manager and husband Kevin Simon. The two got married on August 9, 2013. On August 4, 2016, GloZell and her husband welcomed their first child, via surrogate, naming their daughter O'Zell Gloriana De Green Simon. In 2020, Glozell announced that she had divorced Simon.

References

External links
 

21st-century American comedians
1972 births
Actresses from Orlando, Florida
African-American female comedians
American bloggers
American women bloggers
American women comedians
American YouTubers
Comedy YouTubers
Lifestyle YouTubers
Living people
University of Florida alumni
Video bloggers
21st-century American women
21st-century African-American women writers
21st-century American women writers
21st-century African-American writers
20th-century African-American people
20th-century African-American women